Quiet Waters Park is a  Broward County Park in Deerfield Beach, Florida. Quiet Waters Park is known locally for its annual Renaissance Festival and Ski Rixen cable water-skiing system. Ski Rixen is one of 79 cable water-ski attractions in the world, and the only wakeboard and water ski resort in South Florida. Quiet Waters also features unique Rent-a-Tent and Tepees, a marina with boats for rent, Woofing Waters dog park, several lakes for fishing, basketball courts, Splash Adventure children's water park that is open seasonally. There are also mountain bike trails and the Eagle's Nest children's open-space playground.

References 

Deerfield Beach, Florida
Parks in Broward County, Florida